Matúš Leskovjanský (born 29 May, 1987) is a Slovak professional ice hockey player who is currently playing for HKm Zvolen in the Slovak Extraliga.

External links

HC 21 Prešov players
HK Dukla Michalovce players
HK Spišská Nová Ves players
HKM Zvolen players
GKS Tychy (ice hockey) players
MHk 32 Liptovský Mikuláš players
Living people
Slovak ice hockey forwards
1987 births
Slovak expatriate sportspeople in Poland
Expatriate ice hockey players in Poland
Slovak expatriate ice hockey people